The Vallabhabhorn Order was established on 22 March 1919 (B.E. 2461) by King Rama VI of The Kingdom of Siam (now Thailand) to reward personal service to the sovereign.

Members of the order are entitled to use the postnominals ว.ภ.

Insignia
The decoration consists of a single class. The insignia is an 8 pointed silver pendant suspended from the ribbon.

References

 
Orders of chivalry of Thailand
Awards established in 1919
1910s establishments in Siam